Deniz Türüç (born 29 January 1993) is a footballer who plays as a midfielder for İstanbul Başakşehir. Born in the Netherlands, he represents Turkey at international level.

Club career
In August 2019, Türüç signed a three-year deal with Turkish Süper Lig side Fenerbahçe

In November 2020, whilst on loan at İstanbul Başakşehir, he scored via a free kick against Manchester United at Old Trafford in a 4–1 defeat in the UEFA Champions League.

International career
Türüç was born in the Netherlands to Turkish parents. He made his international debut for the Turkey national football team in a friendly 3–1 win over Moldova on 27 March 2017.

Career statistics

Club

International goals
Scores and results list, Turkey's goal tally first.

References

External links
 
 
 
 
 Voetbal International profile 

1993 births
Living people
Footballers from Enschede
Turkish footballers
Turkey international footballers
Turkey B international footballers
Turkey youth international footballers
Dutch people of Turkish descent
Dutch footballers
Netherlands youth international footballers
Association football midfielders
Go Ahead Eagles players
De Graafschap players
Eredivisie players
Eerste Divisie players
Süper Lig players
Kayserispor footballers
Fenerbahçe S.K. footballers
İstanbul Başakşehir F.K. players